Thiago Junior Aquino (born 3 April 1984), simply known as Thiago Junio is  a Brazilian professional footballer who last played for Felda United in Malaysia Premier League as a defender.

Club career
After playing for Brazil U17 in 2001 FIFA World Youth Championship, he signed for Atlético Mineiro in 2001. He spent the following season on loan at Danish Superliga club with Aalborg BK. Making 5 appearances for Atlético Mineiro, he signed for América Mineiro. In the following seasons, he continued to play in lower divisions of club football.

He entered Portuguese football with Gondomar in 2007. However the stint was brief as in the following year he returned home to Brazil. He again tried his luck with various clubs in the lower division. In 2014, entered Asian football by signing for Đồng Nai of Vietnam. He joined his current club, Perak FA, a team in Malaysia Super League in December 2014.

While in Malaysia, he also was selected in a Malaysia League XI team, composed of Super League and Premier League players, in a friendly against visiting clubs Tottenham Hotspur F.C. and Liverpool F.C in May 2015. He scored the only goal for Malaysia XI against Tottenham Hotspur in a 1–2 loss for Malaysia XI.

Career statistics

Club

Honours
Man of the Match

•Piala Malaysia Semi-finals 2017 (Perak versus JDT)

References

External links

1984 births
Living people
Association football defenders
Brazilian footballers
Atlético Minero footballers
AaB Fodbold players
América Futebol Clube (MG) players
Sociedade Esportiva do Gama players
Ceará Sporting Club players
Gondomar S.C. players
Ceilândia Esporte Clube players
Canoas Sport Club players
São Raimundo Esporte Clube footballers
Esporte Clube Noroeste players
Nacional Esporte Clube (MG) players
Dong Nai FC players
Perak F.C. players
Campeonato Brasileiro Série A players
Campeonato Brasileiro Série B players
Liga Portugal 2 players
Danish Superliga players
V.League 1 players
Brazil youth international footballers